Gregory Middleton is a Canadian cinematographer, who won the Genie Award for Best Cinematography at the 29th Genie Awards for his work on the film Fugitive Pieces.

He was also nominated for Kissed at the 18th Genie Awards in 1997, for The Falling at the 19th Genie Awards in 1998, for The Five Senses at the 20th Genie Awards in 1999, for Between Strangers at the 23rd Genie Awards in 2002, and for Falling Angels at the 24th Genie Awards in 2004. He is also a two-time Emmy Award nominee for Outstanding Cinematography for a Single-Camera Series (One Hour), for his work on Game of Thrones. He serves as a cinematographer for the superhero streaming series Moon Knight for Disney+ with Mohamed Diab.

He is an alumnus of the University of British Columbia.

References

External links

Best Cinematography Genie and Canadian Screen Award winners
Canadian cinematographers
University of British Columbia alumni
Living people
Canadian television directors
Year of birth missing (living people)